Jeandelaincourt is a commune in the Meurthe-et-Moselle department in north-eastern France.

Geography 

 The village is situated at the foot of Mont Saint Jean (407m), 32 km North-east of Nancy.
 A natural path of discovery and a dashing pond located on the village.

History 

First tracks in 1090 under the name "Godelincourt", the village has a succession of several lords before finally Jeandelaincourt name in reference to the last lord named Jean.
 Before installing the slate factory in 1893 the village was rural.
 Damage during the war 1914-1918
 Heavily damaged by the fighting in September 1944.

Demography

Monuments and sites 

Gallo-Roman discoveries on Mount Saint Jean.
 Castles (or fortified houses) 14th/17th centuries. (see photos)
-Fortified-House "The Horgne" is an imposing building (now farm) which has a simple facade and a round tower on the back. It is located below the High Street at a place called "The Horgne".

-The second fortified-house is located high above the village, not far from the church.
It has a facade with lattice windows and walled, above the front door, the date "1318" inscribed on the coat of arms of the lords of Jeandelaincourt. This one was also equipped with a round tower, now destroyed
 Some nice houses 19th Louis Adt Avenue.
 Church 14th century (Romanesque tower).
 Jeandelaincourt is known beyond the borders for his slate factory closed a few years ago.

See also
Communes of the Meurthe-et-Moselle department

References 

Communes of Meurthe-et-Moselle